The Gildas Quartet is a British string quartet formed at the Royal Northern College of Music in 2011. They have studied with Oliver Wille, Robin Ireland, and Catherine Manson, and have also benefited from  masterclasses from Alfred Brendel, Paul Cassidy, Gabor Takacs Nagy, and András Keller among others.

The quartet are City Music Foundation Artists and Associate Ensemble at the Birmingham Conservatoire.They have performed at major venues such as the Wigmore Hall, Carnegie Hall (via video) and Purcell Room. In 2013 they performed live on BBC Radio 3 program In Tune.

The Gildas Quartet were semi-finalists at the Melbourne International Chamber Music Competition 2018

Members 

The Quartet consists of Christopher Jones, Gemma Sharples (violin), Kay Stephen (viola) and Anna Menzies (cello).

References

External links

English string quartets
Contemporary classical music ensembles